Sam McVey or Sam McVea (May 17, 1884 – December 23, 1921) was a Hall of Fame heavyweight boxer who fought during the early 20th century. McVey ranked alongside Jack Johnson, Joe Jeanette, Sam Langford, and Harry Wills as the top black heavyweights of their generation. All of them, except Johnson, were denied a shot at the world heavyweight championship due to the color bar, which ironically was maintained by Johnson when he became the first black fighter to win the world heavyweight title. Despite being denied a title shot, McVea enjoyed a famed career that took him across the globe.

In 96 documented fights in at least 10 different countries, McVey only lost 16 bouts. His greatest wins include two victories over both Sam Langford and Harry Wills, which won him the World Colored Heavyweight Championship on two occasions, respectively. In his later, years he worked as a trainer and sparring partner for both black and white fighters training for important bouts.

Biography

Fighting  out of Oxnard, California, McVey stood 5′10½″ inches tall and fought at a weight of between 205 and 220 lbs. He relied more on brute strength than finesse in the ring.  His first pro fight listed on boxrec took place in 1902 at the age of 18, but a newspaper from 1902, on his then-upcoming fight with Jack Fogarty, lists five earlier fights he won in Australia, and a further two that took place in California. However In those days, few mixed-race fights took place, so McVey frequently fought the other top black boxers of his time, including Sam Langford (15 times), Joe Jeanette (5 times), Harry Wills (5 times), and Jack Johnson (3 times). Overall, McVey's boxing record was 65 wins, 16 losses, and 12 draws.

McVey spent much of his prime years fighting overseas. He left for Paris in 1907 and fought there for four years. McVey left Paris in 1911 for Australia. He fought there for three more years before finally returning to the U.S.

On December 31, 1908 in Paris, Sam McVey competed in a mixed style bout against jujutsu expert Tano Matsuda, knocking him out in ten seconds. In the earlier part of this century, such bouts were occasionally held in Japan pitting western boxers against judo or jujutsu fighters.

On April 17, 1909, in Paris, Sam McVey fought Joe Jeanette in a bout considered one of the greatest and certainly one of the longest of the 20th century. The fight went 50 rounds and lasted three and a half hours. McVey was generally agreed to be winning through most of the fight, particularly the 21st and 22nd round, knocking Jeanette down repeatedly. By the 40th round, however, Jeanette had recovered while McVey was lagging and knocked down repeatedly. Ultimately McVey's eyes had swollen shut and he was forced to quit.

In 1912, McVey was one of the contenders for the World Colored Heavyweight Championship fought at various venues across Australia.  Sam Langford his opponent, was a Black Canadian popularly known as the Boston Tar Baby and reputedly one of the greatest fighters of all time, beating champions in the lightweight to heavyweight classes. 
Before the matches, the boxers gave demonstrations of their skill.  Before his beating, Sam McVea in the Exhibition Rink Buildings in Perth, Sam Langford stayed at the Nedlands Park Hotel where he:
gave exhibitions of punching the ball, throwing the medicine bag sparring, etc. His work was a revelation. Langford allowed his sparring partners to hit him just when and where they pleased. After witnessing his exhibition of wonderful foot and head work one could easily understand how the big-little fellow came to lay low the best boxers in the world. Langford is as fast on his feet and as graceful as a ballet-dancer. He carries a punch like unto that of a kick of a mule, and is practically impervious to punishment. Dick Cullen hit him some terrific punches on the chin last Wednesday - punches that would have put the ordinary boxer away for the full count; but the Tar Baby only grinned and shoved out his head for more. He is truly a remarkable fighter.

McVey contracted pneumonia and died December 23, 1921, in New York City, penniless while still an active fighter. His burial and grave marker were paid for by Jack Johnson.

Legacy & honors

In 2020 award-winning author Mark Allen Baker published the first comprehensive account of The World Colored Heavyweight Championship, 1876-1937, with McFarland & Company, a leading independent publisher of academic & nonfiction books. This history traces the advent and demise of the Championship, the stories of the talented professional athletes who won it, and the demarcation of the color line both in and out of the ring.

For decades the World Colored Heavyweight Championship was a useful tool to combat racial oppression-the existence of the title a leverage mechanism, or tool, used as a technique to counter a social element, “drawing the color line.”

McVey was inducted into the International Boxing Hall of Fame in 1999.

Professional boxing record
All information in this section is derived from BoxRec, unless otherwise stated.

Official record

All newspaper decisions are officially regarded as “no decision” bouts and are not counted to the win/loss/draw column.

Unofficial record

Record with the inclusion of newspaper decisions to the win/loss/draw column.

References

1884 births
1921 deaths
Heavyweight boxers
African-American boxers
World colored heavyweight boxing champions
International Boxing Hall of Fame inductees
American male boxers
Boxers from Texas
People from Gonzales County, Texas
20th-century African-American people